This is a list of people who have lived in or been associated with Greenwich, Connecticut now or in the past and are well known beyond the town.

They are listed based on the area in which person is best known (in alphabetical order within each category):

Actors, directors, producers
 Christopher Abbott, American actor

 Bill Boggs, actor, author and journalist
 Scooter Braun, music producer and talent manager
 Glenn Close, actress
 Terry Crews, actor
 Gabriela Dias, actress, producer, writer, humanitarian
 Johnny Doran, actor
 Henry Fonda (1905–1982), actor
 Jane Fonda, actress
 Peter Fonda (1940–2019), actor 
 Mel Gibson, actor, director, producer
 Shelley Hack (born 1947), actress
 Bob Haymes (1923–1989), actor and composer
 Bryce Dallas Howard (born 1981), actress; daughter of filmmaker Ron Howard
 Ron Howard, actor and director
 Leatrice Joy (1893–1985), silent film actress
 Tom Kuntz (born 1972), commercial and music video director
 Joseph E. Levine (1905–1987), film producer and distributor
 Rod Lurie (born 1962), director and screenwriter
 Mary Tyler Moore (1936–2017), actress
 Bert Parks (1914–1992), actor, television personality
 Bijou Phillips, actress, singer and model
 Linda Purl (born 1955), actress and singer
 Elisabeth Röhm (born 1973), actress
 Kelly Rohrbach (born 1990), model and actress
 Madeleine Sackler (born 1983), director, producer, and editor
 Adam Sandler, actor, director, producer, television personality
 Rick Schroder (born 1970), actor
 George C. Scott (1927–1999), actor
 Zack Snyder (born 1966), film director
 Heather Thomas (born 1957), actress and screenwriter
 Dyanne Thorne (1936–2020), actress, model and ordained minister
 Justin Zackham, director and screenwriter; writer of The Bucket List
 Hasan Minhaj, comedian, writer, producer, political commentator, actor, and television host

Musicians, models, other entertainers

 Tom Bergeron, host of America's Funniest Home Videos and Dancing With the Stars
 Victor Borge (1909–2000), pianist and comedian
 A. Whitney Brown, writer and comedian
 Eugenia Cooney, YouTuber and influencer
 Alice Cooper, singer-songwriter and actor
 Wilhelmina Cooper (1940–1980), supermodel
 Gary Dell'Abate (born 1961), radio personality known as "Baba Booey"; producer at The Howard Stern Show
 Tommy Dorsey (1905–1956), trombonist and bandleader in the Big Band era
 Clyde Fitch (1865–1909), dramatist
 Stephan Galfas, Grammy Award-nominated record producer
 Kathie Lee Gifford, television personality, wife of the late Frank Gifford
 Roger Glover (born 1945), bass guitarist for Deep Purple, songwriter and record producer 
 Cynthia Gregory, prima ballerina
 Bob Haymes (1923–1989), actor and composer
 Ray Henderson (1896–1970), songwriter
 Jim Henson (1936–1990), puppeteer, animator, cartoonist, actor, inventor, composer, and screenwriter
 Erich Kunzel (1935–2009), conductor of the Cincinnati Pops Orchestra
 Rodney Leinhardt (born 1970), professional wrestler
 Jana Mashonee, Native American singer-songwriter
 Michael Matijevic, lead singer of Steelheart
 Stefano Miceli (born 1975), conductor and pianist
 Tom Noonan (born 1951), actor, director, playwright
 Jack Paar (1918–2004), host of The Tonight Show
 Regis Philbin (1931–2020), television personality
 Caroline Polachek, singer
 Francesca Roberto, operatic soprano
 Diana Ross, singer and actress
 Stephanie Seymour, model; wife of Peter M. Brant, publishing mogul
 Judy Sheindlin, television personality and producer
 Hana Soukupova, model; wife of Drew Aaron, paper magnate and entrepreneur; restored Greenwich's North Court estate
 Wanda Sykes, comedian and actress 
 Montel Williams, television personality

Sports

 Ken Bell, NFL player
 Rolando Blackman, NBA player
 Bobby Bonilla (born 1963), MLB player
 Aaron Boone, MLB player and manager 
 George Brown (born 1935), soccer player and coach
 Jim Brown (1908–1994), soccer player and coach
 Glenn Caruso (born 1974), football player and coach 
 Chris Cleary (born 1979), professional soccer player 
 Casey Close (born 1963), MLB player, sports agent, husband of Gretchen Carlson
 Gerrit Cole (born 1990), MLB player
 David Cone, MLB player
 Carlos Delgado, New York Mets first baseman
 Tony DeLuca (1960–1999), NFL player
 George Foster (born 1948), MLB player
 Doug Friedman, professional ice hockey player
 Frank Gifford (1930–2015), NFL player, sportscaster; husband of Kathie Lee Gifford
 Joe Girardi, manager of the New York Yankees
 Gail Goodrich (born 1943), basketball player; studio analyst for NBA TV
 Dorothy Hamill, Olympic figure-skating gold medalist
 Allan Houston (born 1971), NBA player
 Andres Jasson, MLS player
 Cornelius Johnson (wide receiver), American football player, Division 1 Wide Receiver
 Mike Keenan, professional ice hockey coach
 Ralph Kiner (1922–2014), Baseball Hall of Famer and broadcaster
 Alexei Kovalev, NHL player
 Pat LaFontaine, NHL player
 Ivan Lendl, tennis player
 Skip Lockwood (born 1946), MLB pitcher
 Dave Maloney, hockey player and radio commentator
 Pedro Martínez, MLB player
 Lee Mazzilli, MLB player and coach
 Shane McMahon, World Wrestling Entertainment wrestler and executive, son of Vince and Linda McMahon
 Donovan Mitchell, NBA player for the Utah Jazz
 Markus Näslund, retired NHL player
 Ahmad Rashad, NFL player
 Helen Resor (born 1985), ice hockey player; 2006 Winter Olympics bronze medalist 
 Mike Richter, NHL Stanley Cup-winning goalie 
 Martin St. Louis, NHL player
 Tom Seaver, Cy Young Award-winning pitcher and Baseball Hall of Fame inductee
 Kevin Shattenkirk (born 1989), professional ice hockey player
 John Sullivan, NFL player
 Craig Swan (born 1950), MLB pitcher
 Mark Teixeira, MLB player for New York Yankees
 Tim Teufel (born 1958), MLB player
 Donna de Varona (born 1947), Olympic gold medalist in swimming; sportscaster
 Fay Vincent, commissioner of baseball (1989–1992)
 Billy Wagner, MLB pitcher
 Alister Walker, professional squash player
 Mats Wilander (born 1964), tennis player
 Colin Wilson (born 1989), hockey player
 Steve Young (born 1961), NFL player
 Shahid Zaman, professional squash player

Authors, writers

 Taylor Caldwell (1900–1985), novelist
 Truman Capote (1924–1984), writer
 Caroline B. Cooney (born 1947), horror and mystery author
 A. J. Cronin (1896–1981), Scottish author
 Frederick Exley (1929–1992), author
 Howard Fast (1914–2003), author; had an editorial column in The Greenwich Time
 Jonathan Fast (born 1948), author and social work educator 
 James F. Fixx (1932–1984), author 
 Thomas Flanagan (1923–2002), writer, university professor
 Carl Higbie, decorated Navy SEAL and author
 John Jakes (born 1932), novelist
 D. J. Machale, author of the Pendragon series
 R. A. Montgomery (1936–2014), author
 Evan Osnos (born 1976), journalist and author
 Lawrence Riley (1896–1974), playwright and screenwriter
 Mark Salzman (born 1959), author
 Anya Seton (1904–1990), author of historical romances
 Barbara W. Tuchman (1912–1989), non-fiction author

Artists, architects, designers, cartoonists

 Robert Denning (1927–2005), interior designer
 Tony DiPreta (1921–2010), comic book and comic strip artist
 Edgar de Evia (1910–2003), photographer, artist and author
 Steve Giovinco (born 1961), photographer
 Tommy Hilfiger (born 1951), fashion designer
 Bai Ji Kong (1932–2018), contemporary painter originally from China
 Ranan Lurie (born 1932), editorial cartoonist and journalist
Elmer Livingston MacRae (1875–1953), artist
 Robert Motherwell (1915–1991), abstract expressionist
 John Cullen Murphy (1919–2004), comic artist
 Leonard Ochtman (1854–1935), his wife Mina Fonda Ochtman (1862–1924), artists and part of the Cos Cob Art Colony
 Edward Clark Potter (1857–1923), sculptor, designed the lions in front of the New York Public Library
 John von Bergen (born 1971), sculptor
 Mort Walker (1923–2018), cartoonist; creator of Beetle Bailey

Famous guests at the Bush-Holley House
 Willa Cather, novelist
 William Merritt Chase, artist
 Childe Hassam, artist
 Theodore Robinson, artist
Lincoln Steffens, investigative journalist
 John Henry Twachtman, artist and town resident
 J. Alden Weir, artist

Government

 Richard Blumenthal, U.S. Senator, state Attorney General
 George H. W. Bush (1924–2018), 41st President of the United States
 George W. Bush, 43rd President of the United States
 Prescott Bush (1895–1972), U.S. Senator; father of George H.W. Bush
 Chris Coons, U.S. Senator of Delaware
 Homer Stille Cummings (1870–1956), U.S. Attorney General, 1933–1939 and Stamford mayor
Florence Finney (1903–1994), first woman to serve as president pro tempore of the Connecticut State Senate
 Russell Benjamin Harrison (1854–1936), diplomat, member of the Indiana House of Representatives and Indiana Senate,  son of President Benjamin Harrison and Caroline Harrison, great-grandson of President and Major General William Henry Harrison, father of U.S. Representative William Henry Harrison II
 Hope Hicks (born 1988), White House Director of Strategic Communications
 Jim Himes, U.S. Representative for Connecticut's 4th congressional district
 Ned Lamont, 89th Governor of Connecticut
 Samuel A. Lewis (1831–1913), politician and philanthropist
 Clare Boothe Luce (1903–1987), congresswoman, ambassador, playwright
 Mary Harrison McKee (1858–1930), daughter of President Benjamin Harrison and Caroline Harrison, great-granddaughter of President and Major General William Henry Harrison, Acting First Lady of the United States 1892–1893
 Michael L. Morano (1915–2000), businessman and politician
 Jennifer Psaki, Assistant to the President of the United States and the White House Communications Director
 Craig Roberts Stapleton, U.S. ambassador
 David Stockman, director of the Office of Management and Budget
 Kathleen Kennedy Townsend, member of the Kennedy political family; Lt. Governor of Maryland
 William M. "Boss" Tweed (1823–1878), famously corrupt New York City official
 Thomas Watson Jr. (1914–1993), IBM President and 16th United States Ambassador to the Soviet Union
 Lowell P. Weicker Jr. (born 1931), Connecticut Governor, U.S. Senator and U.S. Representative

Judges, lawyers
 Roy Cohn (1927–1986), lawyer made famous as an aide to U.S. Senator Joseph McCarthy
 Lebbeus R. Wilfley (1866–1926), Attorney-General of the Philippines and Judge of the United States Court for China

Business

 Warren Anderson (1921–2014), chairman of Union Carbide and CEO at the time of the Bhopal disaster
 Mary Anselmo, billionaire widow of Reynold "Rene" Anselmo
 Reynold "Rene" Anselmo (1926–1995), founder of PanAmSat
 Paul V. Applegarth, CEO of Millennium Challenge Corporation and executive of World Bank, Bank of America, and American Express
 Richard Attias, Moroccan events producer with his spouse, Cécilia
 Joseph Beninati, real estate developer and private equity investor
 Barton Biggs (1932–2012), money manager
 Steven Black, co-CEO of the Investment Bank at JP Morgan Chase & Co. 
 Peter M. Brant, publisher, founder of the Greenwich Polo Club, husband of model Stephanie Seymour
 Richard C. Breeden, chairman of the U.S. Securities and Exchange Commission
 Steven A. Cohen, runs Point72 Asset Management in Stamford, and majority owner of the New York Mets
 Ray Dalio (born 1949), CEO of Bridgewater Associates of Westport 
 Robert Diamond (born 1951), banker, President and CEO for investment banking at Barclays
 Brady Dougan (born 1959), CEO of Credit Suisse First Boston; CEO of Credit Suisse Group in Zurich
 Börje Ekholm, CEO of Ericsson
 Gerard Finneran, investment banker arrested after 1995 air rage incident
 Martin Frankel (born 1954), financier 
 Richard S. Fuld Jr., CEO of Lehman Brothers Holdings Inc.
 Louis V. Gerstner Jr., CEO of IBM
 Vladimir Gusinsky, Russian media baron
 Leona Helmsley (1920–2007), hotel owner
 Joseph Hirshhorn (1899–1981), mining tycoon and namesake of the Hirshhorn Museum and Sculpture Garden on the Mall in Washington, D.C.
 Paul Tudor Jones, runs Tudor Investments and lives in the Belle Haven section of town
 Mel Karmazin, CEO of Sirius Satellite Radio
 Raymond Kassar (1928–2017), chairman and CEO of Atari
 Donald M. Kendall, CEO of PepsiCo
 Edward Lampert, head of ESL Investments
 George Lauder (1837–1924), Scottish-American billionaire industrialist, partner in the Carnegie Steel Company, board member of U.S. Steel, owned the Lauder Greenway Estate
 Andrew Madoff, financier and son of Bernie Madoff,
 Mark Madoff, financier and son of Bernie Madoff
 William F. May (1915–2011), chemical engineer; CEO of the American Can Company; co-founded the Film Society of Lincoln Center
 Charles Peter McColough, Chairman and CEO of Xerox
 Henry McKinnell (born 1943), CEO and chairman of the board of Pfizer Inc.
 Linda McMahon, co-founder of World Wrestling Entertainment with husband Vince McMahon
 Stephanie McMahon, World Wrestling Entertainment chairwoman and co-CEO, daughter of Vince and Linda McMahon
 Vince McMahon, World Wrestling Entertainment founder, former chairman and CEO, husband of Linda McMahon
 John Meriwether, runs JWM Partners 
 Tim Michels, co-owner of Michels Corporation, 2022 Republican nominee for Wisconsin Governor
 Robert Hiester Montgomery (1872–1953), accountant and donor of 102-acre Montgomery Pinetum Park 
 Indra Nooyi, CEO of PepsiCo
 Thomas Peterffy, head of Interactive Brokers, billionaire
 Raymond Sackler (1920–2017), co-founder of Purdue Pharma
 Alan Schwartz, CEO of Bear Stearns
 Daniel Scotto, director of research at Bear Stearns, DLJ, L.F. Rothschild and S&P, institutional investor
 John Sculley, president of PepsiCo; CEO of Apple
 Christopher A. Sinclair, chairman and CEO of Mattel; CEO of PepsiCo
 Chip Skowron, hedge fund portfolio manager convicted of insider trading
 Barry Sternlicht, founder of Starwood Capital Group
 Edward Vick, CEO of Young & Rubicam 
 Sanford I. Weill, banker, financier, formerly chief executive officer and chairman of Citigroup
 John Weinberg (1925–2006), CEO of Goldman Sachs
 Cameron Winklevoss, Bitcoin investors and owners of Gemini cryptocurrency exchange headquartered in New York City; twin brother of Tyler
 Tyler Winklevoss, twin brother of Cameron; partner in Gemini and Bitcoin related ventures
 John Zimmer (born 1984), co-founder and president of Lyft

Journalists, sportscasters
 Chris Berman (born 1955), host and anchor of various ESPN television programs
 Gretchen Carlson, television news personality, wife of Casey Close
 Charles C. W. Cooke, editor of National Review Online
 Rita Cosby (born 1964), television news personality<ref>Hagey, Keach, "A familiar face to speak at Greenwich High graduation", article in The Advocate of Stamford, Connecticut, p A3, Stamford edition, June 8, 2007</ref>
 Bill Evans, former WABC-TV weatherman
 Dan Hicks, NBC sportscaster
 Matt Lauer, Today Show television host
 Louis Rukeyser (1933–2006), business columnist, economic commentator, and television personality
 Lara Spencer, co-host of ABC's Good Morning America; host of Antiques Roadshow Hannah Storm, ESPN sportscaster and host of CBS television's The Early Show''
 Trey Wingo, ESPN sportscaster
 Warner Wolf, television and radio sportscaster

Other
 Carolyn Bessette-Kennedy (1966–1999), wife of John F. Kennedy Jr.
 Colonel Raynal Bolling (1877–1918), first U.S. officer to be killed in combat in World War I
 Blackleach Burritt (1744–1794), noted clergyman during the American Revolution
 Douglas Campbell (1896–1990), first American World War I aviator flying in an American unit to achieve the status of ace
 Michael Fossel (born 1950), professor of clinical medicine at Michigan State University
 Bill Gold (1921–2018), graphic designer
 G. Lauder Greenway (1904–1981), Chairman of the Metropolitan Opera Association; patron of the arts
 James Greenway (1903–1989), curator, Museum of Comparative Zoology, ornithologist, Lt. Commander U.S. Navy
 Kara Hultgreen (1965–1994), lieutenant in the U.S. Navy; first female naval carrier-based fighter pilot
 Barry Klarberg (born 1961), manager for athletes and entertainers 
 Martha Moxley (1960–1975), high-profile murder victim
 Farah Pahlavi, Iranian empress
 Katherine E. Price, philanthropist and Papal countess
 Hubert Scott-Paine (1891–1954), British-American aircraft and boat designer, including PT boats
 Ernest Thompson Seton (1860–1946), author, helped found the Boy Scouts of America
 Mickey Sherman, criminal-defense attorney
 Polly Lauder Tunney (1907–2008), philanthropist, wife of World Heavyweight Champion Gene Tunney 
 Cornelius Wendell Wickersham (1885–1968), U.S. Army officer, lawyer, and author

See also
 List of people from Connecticut
 List of people from Bridgeport, Connecticut
 List of people from Brookfield, Connecticut
 List of people from Darien, Connecticut
 List of people from Hartford, Connecticut
 List of people from New Canaan, Connecticut
 List of people from New Haven, Connecticut
 List of people from Norwalk, Connecticut
 List of people from Redding, Connecticut
 List of people from Stamford, Connecticut
 List of people from Westport, Connecticut

References 

People
 
Greenwich Connecticut